Busujima (Kanji: 毒島, 毒嶋, 毒嶌) is a Japanese surname. Notable people with the surname include:

Hideyuki Busujima (born 1952/1953), Japanese billionaire businessman, son of Kunio
Kunio Busujima (1925–2016), Japanese billionaire businessman

Japanese-language surnames